Mississippi Jack is the fifth book in the critically acclaimed Bloody Jack book series. It continues after Jacky and her schoolmates return to Boston after being on a slave ship for several months. The Bloody Jack series begins with Bloody Jack, Curse of the Blue Tattoo, Under the Jolly Roger, In the Belly of the Bloodhound, and continues with My Bonny Light Horseman, Rapture of the Deep, The Wake of the Lorelei Lee, The Mark of the Golden Dragon, Viva Jacquelina!, Boston Jacky, and Wild Rover No More.

Plot summary

In Mississippi Jack, the fifth installment in the Bloody Jack 
series, the intrepid Jacky Faber, having once again eluded British 
authorities, heads west, hoping that no one will recognize her in the 
wilds of America. There she tricks the tall-tale hero Mike Fink out of 
his flatboat, equips it as a floating casino-showboat, and heads south 
to New Orleans, battling murderous bandits, British soldiers, and other 
scoundrels along the way.

Characters

 Jacky Faber- The main protagonist of the entire series; now sixteen years old and proclaimed a pirate by King George, Jacky takes up the American Wilderness and starts a casino showboat business.
 James 'Jaimy' Emerson Fletcher- Jacky's lover for the entire book series; throughout the series, he's always been one step behind Jacky. On grounds of their distant relationship, Jaimy has an affair with country girl, Clementine Jukes.
 John Higgins- Jacky's devoted butler and right-hand man throughout Jacky's adventure through America.
 Mike Fink- An American keelboat legend and feared by the Yankee townfolk, Mike Fink knows the rivers like the back of his hand and being victim to Jacky's wit, he loses his keelboat to her and vows to kill her.
 Clementine Amaryllis Jukes- The daughter of an alcoholic, murderous farmer; Clementine saves Jaimy from death and sails with Jaimy in pursuit of Jacky before she learns Jacky is another woman and Clementine takes up a position on Jacky's showboat.
 Yancy Beauregard Cantrell- The sharp card-dealing Creole gentleman, Cantrell's widowed and raises a daughter that serves a purpose in an Abolitionist scam of his. Cantrell serves a primary role in the book as he is one of the many guests that take the entire route to New Orleans aboard Jacky's casino-boat.
 Captain Lord Richard Allen- A womanizing young captain of King George's fleet who is in charge of a deal with the American Indians to kill for scalps and money. Jacky begins an affair with Allen as soon as they come to terms.
 Jim Tanner- Another right-hand man of Jacky's; Tanner is always given secondhand jobs and it's obvious he does not appreciate some of the assignments he is given but after Clementine's split from Jaimy, she takes up perfectly with Tanner.
 Lieutenant Flashby- An antagonist of the book, Flashby is part of Allen's partnership with the Indians and secretly knows who Jacky Faber truly is. He has Allen kidnap Jacky, but their plan is foiled, and Jacky forces him, along with his cohort Moseley, to walk the plank into the Mississippi.
 Crow Jane- Jacky's showboat cook and personal bodyguard.
 The Hawkes Boys ('Thaniel and Matty)- Some hoodlums Crow Jane used to run with that hired as Jacky's bodyguards.
 Mam'selle Claudelle de Bourbon- A prostitute from New Orleans, Jacky resorts with her once she reaches New Orleans.
 Lightfoot, Tepeki, Chee-a-Quat, and the Indian tribe- An Indian tribe Jacky befriends before being exposed by Flashby; even though Lightfoot and Chee-a-Quat are evidently angered and shocked, they come back to rescue her from the British.
 Solomon- A negro slave that Jacky and the crew up with and save from slave masters. Solomon is proven to be very intelligent with a guitar and is the reason Jacky is tarred and feathered in New Orleans for by the feared Beam family.
 Katy Deere- Another dear friend of Jacky's from her Lawson Peabody serving-girl days.  Katy continues to be developed in this book, heading out west with Jacky to settle an old family score.
 Chloe Cantrell- The daughter of Yancy Cantrell.  Plays the harpsichord.
 Reverend Clawson- A Christian preacher that leads a revival as part of Jacky's routine show.
He is one of the many guests that go with Jacky the whole route to New Orleans.

 Daniel Prescott- A boy who fell victim to the Cave-in-Rock bandits. He travels with Jacky the whole way to New Orleans.
 The Beam Family- A Bible-thumping group of hypocritical racists that has Jacky arrested and punished (tar and feather) for helping Solomon escape to freedom.  They are all eventually killed by Katy, Lightfoot, and Chee-a-quat.
 Mr. McCoy and Mr. Beatty- Two highwaymen that nearly kill Jaimy.
 Captain Rutherford- The ruthless captain in charge of arresting Jacky and sending her back to King George in the beginning.
 The Lawson Peabody School Girls- Jacky's allies that try to help free her from Captain Rutherford and the British.
 Ezra Pickering- Jacky's trusted attorney.

References to actual events

Jacky begins to market her own patent medicine consisting of an alcoholic tincture of opium (better known as laudanum) and Kentucky bourbon, which she markets during medicine shows.  Most patent medicines of the time were made up with similar ingredients and similar lavish claims for their efficacy.  Use of these compounds was widespread and unregulated.

The crew encounter a secret abolitionist running a slave-selling scam in which the "slave" is sold, and then escapes to be sold again and again.  Similar plots were sometimes used to trick runaways into cooperating with a sale which would turn out to be final. After the import of foreign slaves was forbidden, the demand for slaves became very high and numerous types of deceit and slave-stealing became common.  Jacky's crew encounters a family of rogues who make their living trying to repossess escaped slaves in the fashion of Patty Cannon.

Jacky herself attempts to pass for quadroon or octoroon as a disguise at one point, in an inversion of the usual trick, which was to pass people who were an eighth or a quarter African heritage as white.  Several times, Jacky reflects on the diversity of her crew, which includes Native Americans, Africans and African-Americans, American Appalachians, British such as herself and her butler (or First Mate) Higgins, and so on.  This reflects the reality of pirate crews of the day, which often contained escaped black slaves.

References to famous characters

 Mike Fink was a real keelboater, reputed to tell tall tales.
 The Lafitte brothers were real pirates, and as Meyer has a subsidiary character note as Jacky's crew approaches New Orleans, Jean Lafitte made most of his money as a fence of stolen goods and a source of illegally imported slaves.
 Near the end of the book, an adopted white Shawnee called Lightfoot, a rifleman who always travels with his native Shawnee "brother," reveals his white surname to be "Bumpus" in an obvious tribute to James Fenimore Cooper's Natty Bumppo.
 Crow Jane's niece might be a reference to Sacajawea, as she "has been on that Lewis and Clark Expedition across the new Louisiana Territiory".

External links
The author's website
Publisher's site
 Amazon.com

2007 American novels
2007 children's books
Children's historical novels
American children's novels
Novels about pirates